Coleophora pendulivalvula is a moth of the family Coleophoridae. It is found in China.

References

pendulivalvula
Moths of Asia
Moths described in 1998